The Diva—Panvel Passenger is a passenger train belonging to Central Railway of India that runs between  and . It is currently being operated with 50119/50120 train numbers on a daily basis.

Average speed and frequency 

The 50119/Diva–Panvel Passenger runs with an average speed of 30 km/h and completes 25 km in 50m. The 50120/Panvel–Diva Passenger runs with an average speed of 34 km/h and completes 25 km in 45m.

Route and halts 

The important halts of the train are:

Coach composite 

The train has standard ICF rakes with max speed of 110 kmph. The train consists of 19 coaches:

 17 General Unreserved
 2 Seating cum Luggage Rake

Traction

Both trains are hauled by a Kalyan Loco Shed-based WDM-3D or WDG-3A diesel locomotive from Diva to Panvel and vice versa.

Rake sharing

The train shares its rake with 50107/50108 Sawantwadi Road–Madgaon Passenger and 50105/50106 Sindhudurg Passenger.

See also 

 Panvel Junction railway station
 Diva Junction railway station
 Sawantwadi Road–Madgaon Passenger
 Sindhudurg Passenger

Notes

References

External links 

 50119/Diva–Panvel Passenger India Rail Info
 50120/Panvel–Diva Passenger India Rail Info

Transport in Thane
Transport in Panvel
Rail transport in Maharashtra
Slow and fast passenger trains in India
Railway services introduced in 2015